We Will Reign is the debut studio album by American rock band The Last Internationale, released on August 19, 2014 by Epic Records.

Track listing

Personnel
 Delila Paz – vocals
 Edgey Pires – guitar
 Brad Wilk – drums

References

External links
 

2014 debut albums
The Last Internationale albums
Epic Records albums
Albums produced by Brendan O'Brien (record producer)